I've Got a Rock in My Sock is a blues album by American blues guitarist and singer Rory Block, it was released in 1986 by Rounder Records.

Track listing
"Send the Man Back Home" (Block) 3:33
"Moon's Goin' Down" (Patton) – 3:25
"Gypsie Boy" (Block) – 5:19
"I've Got a Rock in My Sock" (Block) – 3:01
"Foreign Lander" (Traditional) – 0:45
"Goin' Back to the Country" (Block) – 4:27
"M and O Blues" (Brown) – 3:23
"Lovin' Whiskey" (Block) – 4:06
"Highland Overture" (Block) – 4:28

References

Rory Block albums
1986 albums
Rounder Records albums